Trackhouse Racing is a professional stock car auto racing organization that currently competes in the NASCAR Cup Series. The team is owned by Trackhouse Entertainment Group, a venture of Justin Marks and Grammy Award-winning rapper Armando Christian "Pitbull" Pérez. 

The organization fields two full-time Chevrolet Camaro ZL1 cars: the No. 1 for Ross Chastain and the No. 99 for Daniel Suárez.  It also fields the No. 91 on a part-time basis. Car bodies and engines are provided by Richard Childress Racing.

History
After Leavine Family Racing announced the sale of its assets in summer 2020, former NASCAR Cup Series driver and former World of Outlaws and K&N Pro Series East team owner Justin Marks placed a bid on the sale. LFR eventually sold their assets to Spire Motorsports. On August 14, Marks confirmed the creation of his own team, Trackhouse, and revealed that former Dale Earnhardt Incorporated executive Ty Norris had been brought on to help run the team. At that time, Marks had yet to strike a formal alliance with any manufacturer or team, but already had one potential sponsor lined up. He had also yet to purchase any equipment. From his ownership of a go-kart track and other family business ventures, Marks had the financial wherewithal to purchase a team without other means. Marks aimed to be an unconventional team owner, with plans to use his team ownership platform as an advocate for STEM education. On January 15, 2021, it was announced that Armando Christian Pérez, better known by his stage name Pitbull, had assumed an ownership role in the team. On May 30, motivational speaker and philanthropist Tony Robbins hinted at investing in the team. On June 10, Marks told Sirius XM NASCAR Radio that the team may expand to a two-car operation in 2022. On June 30, 2021, Trackhouse announced their purchase of the NASCAR operations of Chip Ganassi Racing and along with it, its two charters for the No. 1 and the No. 42 teams, therefore announcing the team will be two cars in 2022.

On January 9, 2023, a consortium consisting of Trackhouse, DEJ Management, Jeff Burton Autosports, Inc., and Kevin Harvick Incorporated purchased the CARS Tour.

Car No. 1 history

Ross Chastain (2022–present)

On August 3, 2021, the team announced that Ross Chastain would drive their second car, the No. 1, in 2022. Chastain began the 2022 season with a 40th place finish at the 2022 Daytona 500 and a 29th place finish at Fontana. He then rebounded with a third place finish at Las Vegas and two runner-up finishes at Phoenix and Atlanta. Chastain scored his first career cup win and Trackhouse's first ever win at COTA. A month later, he claimed his second victory at Talladega. At the 2022 NASCAR All-Star Race, Chastain finished 22nd after going airborne from colliding with Kyle Busch, taking Chase Elliott out in the process. At the Indianapolis road course, Chastain crossed the line second to Tyler Reddick, but was penalized and scored 27th place for crossing the access road during the final restart. Chastain made the Championship 4 after doing a video game move at Martinsville by sliding on the outside wall to slingshot his way to overtake Denny Hamlin and finish fifth (Chastain would be credited a finish of fourth after Brad Keselowski was disqualified following post-race tech inspection due to his car failing to meet the minimum weight requirement). He finished third at the Phoenix finale and a career-best second place in the points standings.

Car No. 1 results

Car No. 91 history

Part Time with International Drivers (2022-Present)
On May 24, 2022, Trackhouse announced the creation of Project91, a part-time entry that aims to put international drivers behind the wheel in the Cup Series. The team is due to compete in at least one race during the 2022 season, with the driver and the race yet to be announced, before adding additional races in the 2023 season. Two days later, it was announced that former Formula 1 World Champion Kimi Räikkönen would be driving the No. 91 car at Watkins Glen. Räikkönen finished 37th after crashing on the tire barrier past the bus-stop chicane on lap 45.

Car No. 91 results

Car No. 99 history

Daniel Suárez (2021–present)

On October 7, 2020, the team announced a full-time drive in 2021 with Daniel Suárez as driver. Later, the team announced that it leased a charter from Spire Motorsports to guarantee itself an entry into every 2021 race. Trackhouse aligned with Richard Childress Racing as an engine provider for 2021 as well as operating on RCR's campus in Welcome, North Carolina. Marks chose the 99 as the team number to pay tribute to Carl Edwards. On November 13, former JR Motorsports crew chief Travis Mack was announced as the No. 99's crew chief. Suárez scored the team's first top-five with a fourth-place finish at the Bristol dirt race. With a total of four top-10 finishes, Suárez finished the 2021 season 25th in points.

In February 2022, Trackhouse announced that Freeway Insurance would be a primary sponsor for Suárez and the No. 99 car for five events during the 2022 season. Suárez began the 2022 season with an 18th place finish at the 2022 Daytona 500. He followed it up with a fourth place finish at Fontana. In addition, Suárez finished ninth at Phoenix and fourth at Atlanta. On May 22, Suárez won the NASCAR Open for the second time in his career, which earned him a place in the All-Star Race where he finished fifth. At Sonoma, he became the first Mexican-born driver to win a Cup Series race. Suárez was eliminated in the Round of 12 after finishing 36th at the Charlotte Roval. Suárez would finish career-best tenth in the points standings.

Car No. 99 results

References

External links
 
 

2020 establishments in the United States
NASCAR teams
Auto racing teams established in 2020